Anthony Clemons Jr. (born September 26, 1991) is an American singer. He rose to prominence as a guest artist on Kanye West's 2018 single "All Mine". Clemons has since worked with a multitude of artists, including West, Ty Dolla Sign, Beyoncé, Camila Cabello, Justin Timberlake, the Sunday Service Choir and more. Clemons released his debut EP Happy 2 Be Here in March 2020, featuring Ty Dolla Sign, Timbaland, and Pharrell Williams. The project received a nomination at the 63rd Annual Grammy Awards for Best R&B Album.

Early life 
Clemons was born and raised in Willingboro, New Jersey. His musical taste was shaped by his parents playing Michael Jackson, The Notorious B.I.G. and Stevie Wonder. At age four, Clemons began performing at birthday parties as a Jackson impersonator. While studying at Burlington County Institute of Technology, Clemons was part of the youth choir at the Sharon Baptist Church and joined The Heritage Players and Showstoppers at Willingboro High School. At family events, Clemons would sing with his sisters Ashley and Amber as the "Clemons Trio". In 2009, during his parents' divorce, Clemons began his interest in songwriting. Clemons began recording himself and producing music with Pro Tools and Logic. Clemons attended a semester at Burlington County College before dropping out.

Career 
Clemons began his songwriting career in 2016. Clemons was working at Red Lobster in Cherry Hill and flying to Los Angeles every two weeks as an attempt to meet songwriters and producers. He would return to Philadelphia every time he ran out of money. He studied songwriting at White Hall Arts Academy with Tanisha Hall. Clemons' mother eventually supported him in permanently moving to Los Angeles, where Clemons slept on two friends' floor. Clemons wrote a song a day in exchange for rent. In Los Angeles, Clemons met Ryan Toby who gave him the opportunity to work on Luke James' single "Drip".

In January 2018, Clemons met American producer Bongo ByTheWay, where upon meeting each other for the first time, they recorded eleven tracks together in one day. After the two quickly became close to one another, Bongo ByTheWay introduced Clemons to American singer Jeremih. Clemons recorded the hook for a Jeremih demo titled "All Mine". Jeremih was invited to Wyoming by American rapper Kanye West and played the demo. West then incorporated "All Mine" into his eighth studio album Ye (2018). West then invited Clemons to Wyoming to write for Teyana Taylor's second studio album K.T.S.E.., providing additional vocals on the track "Hurry (feat. Kanye West). Clemons saw an increase in fame after working with West. In September 2018, Clemons was invited to Chicago by West and Chance the Rapper to work on West's ninth studio album. The album was initially titled Yandhi and Clemons was to feature on seven out of eight tracks. Several leaked songs from the album featured contributions from Clemons. Yandhi was reworked and released as Jesus Is King in October 2019, where Clemons was credited on the tracks "Selah", "Everything We Need", and "Water".

Clemons and The World Famous Tony Williams became the lead vocalists of West's Sunday Service Choir that formed in January 2019. That same year, Clemons worked with Beyoncé to write "Mood 4 Eva" for the soundtrack album The Lion King: The Gift. Clemons was invited to the 62nd Annual Grammy Awards for his work with Beyoncé, Cordae, Chance the Rapper, Skrillex, Boys Noize, and Ty Dolla Sign. Clemons co-wrote Camila Cabello's 2020 single "My Oh My" featuring DaBaby; the song peaked at number 12 on the Billboard Hot 100. In March 2020, Clemons released his debut project Happy 2 Be Here, featuring Ty Dolla Sign, Timbaland, and Pharrell Williams. In December 2020, the EP was listed as a nominee at the 63rd Annual Grammy Awards for Best R&B Album.

In December 2020, Clemons released his collaboration with Justin Timberlake, "Better Days". The duo debuted the song at a virtual concert fundraiser organized by Democratic politician Stacey Abrams, with proceeds going towards the Senate runoff election in Georgia. Clemons, along with Timberlake, Bruce Springsteen, Demi Lovato, and Bon Jovi, performed at the inauguration of Joe Biden on January 20, 2021.

On February 26, 2021, Clemons released a reissue of his debut project Happy 2 Be Here as HAPPY 2 BE HERE (Anniversary Edition) with an additional track named "June 1st", commemorating the release of his 2018 breakthrough hit "All Mine" with Kanye West.

Discography

Albums 
 Happy 2 Be Here (2020)

EPs 

 4Play (2022)

Collaborative albums 
 Jesus Is Born (2019)

Singles

Promotional singles

Guest appearances

Awards and nominations

Notes

References 

1991 births
Living people
Burlington County Institute of Technology Westampton Campus alumni
People from Willingboro Township, New Jersey
Singer-songwriters from New Jersey